Limbikani Vanessa Chikupila (born 2 April 1991) is a Malawian footballer who plays as a forward for Blantyre Zero and the Malawi women's national team.

Club career
Chikupila has played for Blantyre Zero in Malawi.

International career
Chikupila capped for Malawi at senior level during two COSAFA Women's Championship editions (2020 and 2021).

References

External links

1991 births
Living people
People from Blantyre
Malawian women's footballers
Women's association football forwards
Malawi women's international footballers